Melrose Park is an unincorporated section of Cheltenham Township on the Philadelphia city line in Montgomery County, Pennsylvania,  It is bordered to the south by Cheltenham Avenue, to the west by Old York Road, to the east by New Second Street and to the north by Ashbourne Road.

SEPTA provides public transportation to Melrose Park via the Melrose Park railroad station and SEPTA bus routes 28, 55, and 70.

Melrose Park is represented by Madeleine Dean in the 4th Congressional District. It is a close-in suburb outside of Philadelphia.

Gratz College
Melrose Park is home to Gratz College, the oldest independent institution of Jewish learning in the United States.

Notable people
Chad Levitt, professional football player
Edgar Lee Masters, poet, biographer, attorney

Gallery

External links

Cheltenham Township, Pennsylvania
Gratz College
Unincorporated communities in Montgomery County, Pennsylvania
Unincorporated communities in Pennsylvania